Kétou is a Yoruba town, arrondissement, and commune located in the Plateau Department of the Republic of Benin (previously called Dahomey). 
The commune covers an area of 2183 square kilometres and as of 2013 had a population of 156,497 people, making it the 13th largest settlement in Benin.

History

Kétou (Ketu) is said to have been founded by Ede, son of Sopasan and grandson of Oduduwa (also known as Odudua, Oòdua and Eleduwa), who ruled the Yoruba kingdom of Ile-Ife (also known as Ife) in present-day Nigeria. The oba (meaning 'king' or 'ruler' in the Yoruba language) is referred to as the Alaketu of Ketu.

Most Gbe speaking people (Ewe, Adja, Fon,and Phera) trace their origins to Ketou. According to their oral history, Ketou was originally known as Ketume ( in the sand). Alternatively, they also refer to Ketou as Amedzorfe ( place of human origin). They were  displaced by the Yoruba because the Yoruba had larger population and access to horses / cavalry from the north.
Ketu North and Ketu South administrative districts in the Volta region of Ghana are named in remembrance of their origins from Ketou in Benin.The indigenes of these two districts are mainly Ewes.

References

 4 Felix Kuadugah-contributor , History of Ketou

Communes of Benin
Arrondissements of Benin
Populated places in the Plateau Department
Communes in Yorubaland
Towns in Yorubaland